François-Henri (also Henry) Clicquot (1732 – 24 May 1790) was a French organ builder and was the grandson of Robert Clicquot and son of Louis-Alexandre Cliquot, who were also noted organ builders. 

Clicquot was born in Paris, where he later died.

The Clicquot firm installed the first noteworthy organ in the cathedral of Notre-Dame de Paris.  Though extensively rebuilt and expanded in the nineteenth century by Aristide Cavaillé-Coll, some of the original Clicquot pipework was reused, notably in the pedal division of that instrument, where it continues to be heard today.  Upon the death of Louis-Alexandre, François-Henri inherited his father's workshop.

He reconstructed the organ of St. Gervais in 1758, and built the organs at St. Sulpice (also notably rebuilt by Aristide Cavaille-Coll), St. Nicolas-des-Champs, Souvigny, and at Poitiers Cathedral.

Clicquot died suddenly before completing the organ at the church of Saint-Germain l'Auxerrois. His son Claude-François Clicquot completed, delivered, and presented the organ on March 7, 1791.

References

 

 Jean-Luc Perrot play the Romance from l’Art du facteur d’orgues, Dom Bedos de Celles on the organ François-Henri Clicquot, Souvigny

External links

 

1732 births
1790 deaths
French pipe organ builders
Engineers from Paris